The 1983 Brownlow Medal was the 56th year the award was presented to the player adjudged the fairest and best player during the Victorian Football League (VFL) home and away season. Ross Glendinning of the North Melbourne Football Club won the medal by polling twenty-four votes during the 1983 VFL season.

Leading votegetters

References 

1983 in Australian rules football
1983